Merav, Meirav may refer to:
 Meirav, a kibbutz in Northern Israel
 An alternative spelling for Merab, daughter of Saul
 Meirav Ben-Ari (born 1975), Israeli politician
 Merav Ben-David (born 1959), Israeli-American ecologist, zoologist, and politician
 Meirav Cohen (born 1983), Israeli politician
 Merav Doster (born 1976), Israeli female screenwriter
 Merav Michaeli (born 1966), Israeli journalist and politician

Hebrew feminine given names